Verena Butalikakis (née Maass; 26 March 1955 – 8 February 2018) was a German politician from the Christian Democratic Union. She was a Member of the Bundestag after the 2002 federal election, standing unsuccessfully in Berlin-Neukölln.

See also 

 List of members of the 15th Bundestag

References 

1955 births
2018 deaths
21st-century German women politicians
21st-century German politicians
Members of the Bundestag for the Christian Democratic Union of Germany
Members of the Bundestag for Berlin
Members of the Bundestag 2002–2005

People from Berlin
German schoolteachers
Members of the Abgeordnetenhaus of Berlin